Tria or TRIA may refer to:

Places
Tria (river), a tributary of the river Barcău in Romania
 Tria, a village in Derna, Bihor, Romania

Other uses
 Tria (The Land Before Time), a character on The Land Before Time
 TRIA Rink, an ice hockey arena in Saint Paul, Minnesota, U.S.
 Transmit and receive integrated assembly, a part of a two-way satellite dish
 Terrorism Risk Insurance Act, a 2002 United States federal law 
 Tria, a line of refillable pens by Letraset

People with the surname
 Giovanni Tria (born 1948), Italian economist and politician
 Giovanni Andrea Tria (1676–1761), Italian bishop, diplomat and historian

See also
Tria juncto in uno, motto of the Order of the Bath
Tria nomina, a Roman naming convention
Trias (disambiguation)